The Cofferer of the Household was formerly an office in the English and British Royal Household. Next in rank to the Comptroller, the holder paid the wages of some of the servants above and below stairs, was a member of the Board of Green Cloth, and sat with the Lord Steward in the Court of the Verge. The cofferer was usually of political rank and always a member of the Privy Council.

The office dates from the Middle Ages, and the position of Cofferer of the Wardrobe. It was abolished by the Civil List and Secret Service Money Act 1782.

List of incumbents

References 

Positions within the British Royal Household
Ceremonial officers in the United Kingdom
1782 disestablishments in Great Britain
Government accounting officials